Jertih (or commonly known as Jerteh) is the most populous town in Besut District, Terengganu, Malaysia. It has been represented by Idris bin Jusoh since 2013 in Dewan Rakyat (Malaysian House of Representatives).

Reside Jerteh contain a hospital called Hospital Besut. It represent the biggest and most important hospital in the Besut District.

See also
Felda Selasih

References

Besut District
Towns in Terengganu